Donald Rex Murphy (born March 10, 1983) is an American former professional baseball infielder. He attended Riverside Polytechnic High School and Orange Coast Community College in Costa Mesa, California, and was selected by the Kansas City Royals in the 5th round of the 2002 Major League Baseball draft.

He is currently the manager for the Class A-Advanced Dunedin Blue Jays, a position he was named to in 2020 after spending several years as a hitting coach in the Toronto Blue Jays organization.

Career

Kansas City Royals
He was acquired by the Oakland Athletics in exchange for cash considerations on November 28, 2006.

Oakland Athletics

He began the  season at Sacramento, the A's Pacific Coast League Triple-A affiliate. He hit .342 for the River Cats and was recalled to Oakland June 8 when Milton Bradley was placed on the disabled list.

Baltimore Orioles
Murphy was signed by the Baltimore Orioles to a minor league deal with a spring training invitation for the 2009 season.

Florida/Miami Marlins
On December 14, 2009, Murphy signed a minor league contract with the Florida Marlins with an invitation to spring training. He was called up on July 3, 2010. He hit a walk-off home run to defeat the Colorado Rockies on July 19, 2010. It was the first walk-off home run by the Marlins that season. Continuing to play with the Marlins in a utility role, Murphy's season was cut short on September 1 when he dislocated his right wrist on a tough catch in the fourth inning. He had surgery the following day, ending one of his most successful seasons.

Murphy became a free agent on October 15 after refusing a minor league assignment. He was re-signed to a minor league contract on October 18.

In 2012, Murphy ended up on the 25-man roster for the Marlins going into opening day. On June 10, 2012, the Marlins designated Murphy for assignment to make room for Gaby Sánchez. He passed waivers and was sent to the New Orleans Zephyrs. On July 27, he was recalled by the Marlins after a trade sent Hanley Ramírez and Randy Choate to the Los Angeles Dodgers for Nathan Eovaldi and Scott McGough. On August 3, he pulled his left hamstring against the Washington Nationals. Five days later, he was placed on the 15-day DL. On August 19, he and Emilio Bonifacio were both reinstated. Murphy ended the year with three homers, six doubles, two triples, 12 RBIs, nine walks and one stolen base while batting .216 in 116 at-bats.

On October 18, 2012, Murphy was outrighted off the Marlins' 40-man roster and elected free agency.

Milwaukee Brewers
On December 17, 2012, Murphy signed a minor league contract with the Milwaukee Brewers. He was released on March 27, 2013.

Chicago Cubs
In April 2013, Murphy signed with the Chicago Cubs. Murphy hit a career-high 11 home runs in 2013 with Chicago, leading to him signing a one-year deal worth $825,000 with the Cubs after the season. Murphy also underwent surgery for a torn meniscus he had originally injured in 2009.

Texas Rangers
On March 26, 2014, Murphy was claimed off waivers from the Chicago Cubs by the Texas Rangers. He was designated for assignment on July 7. With the Rangers, he hit .196, with 4 homers, 14 RBIs, and 11 walks. He was released on July 9.

Cincinnati Reds
On July 18, Murphy was signed by the Cincinnati Reds and assigned to AAA Louisville. He was released in August.

Atlanta Braves
Murphy signed with Atlanta Braves on August 16, 2014.

Second stint with the Brewers
Murphy re-signed with the Milwaukee Brewers for the 2015 season and was assigned to AAA Colorado Springs Sky Sox. On August 2, 2015, Murphy was released by the Brewers.

Coaching 
On February 23, 2016, the Toronto Blue Jays hired Murphy to be their new hitting coach for the Class-A Lansing Lugnuts for the 2016 season. Murphy became the hitting coach for the Advanced-A Dunedin Blue Jays on January 10, 2018. After spending the 2019 season as the hitting coach for the Double-A New Hampshire Fisher Cats, Murphy was named the manager for Dunedin on January 31, 2020. On March 9, 2021, Murphy was named the manager of the Vancouver Canadians for the 2021 season.

References

External links

1983 births
Living people
Kansas City Royals players
Oakland Athletics players
Florida Marlins players
Miami Marlins players
Chicago Cubs players
Texas Rangers players
Orange Coast Pirates baseball players
Burlington Bees players
Spokane Indians players
Wilmington Blue Rocks players
Wichita Wranglers players
Sacramento River Cats players
Stockton Ports players
Norfolk Tides players
New Orleans Zephyrs players
Jupiter Hammerheads players
Iowa Cubs players
Major League Baseball infielders
Baseball players from California
People from Lakewood, California
Riverside Polytechnic High School alumni
Sportspeople from Los Angeles County, California
Phoenix Desert Dogs players
Round Rock Express players
Gwinnett Braves players
Louisville Bats players
Colorado Springs Sky Sox players